Hobart Bay is a census-designated place that was located in Hoonah-Angoon Census Area, Alaska during the 2010 United States Census, but is now part of Petersburg Borough.  As of the 2010 Census, the population of the CDP was one, down from three in 2000.

The bay was named in 1889 by Lieutenant Commander Mansfield of the United States Navy.  The site was first settled as a logging camp.  The population has declined in recent years. Nevertheless, on January 3, 2013, Hobart Bay and a sizable portion of the Hoonah-Angoon Census Area around it were incorporated into the new Petersburg Borough, which has the city of Petersburg as its economic center and is composed primarily of land from the former Petersburg Census Area.

Geography

Hobart Bay is located at 57°27'11" North, 133°23'36" West (57.453007, -133.393308).

The total area is 9.54% water.

Demographics

Hobart Bay first appeared on the 1990 U.S. Census as a census-designated place (CDP).

As of the census of 2000, there were three people, two households, and one family residing in the CDP.  The population density was 0/km2. There were seventeen housing units at an average density of 0.1/sq mi (0.1/km2).  The racial makeup of the CDP was two White and one Native American.

There were two households with no children under the age of eighteen living with them; one was a married couple living together, and one was a male individual.

In the CDP the population was spread out, with two from twenty-five to forty-four and one from forty-five to sixty-four. The median age was forty-four years. There was one female and two males.

The median income for a household in the CDP was $68,750, and the median income for a family was $68,750. The per capita income for the CDP was $34,900.

References

Logging communities in the United States
Populated coastal places in Alaska on the Pacific Ocean
Populated places in Petersburg Borough, Alaska